Kasian (also Romanized as Kasīān and Kasyān; also known as Geseyān, Gīsīan, Kīsīan, and Kīsyān) is a village in Margavar Rural District, Silvaneh District, Urmia County, West Azerbaijan Province, Iran. At the 2006 census, its population was 1,314, in 236 families.

References 

Populated places in Urmia County